Lonban, one of the oldest quarters of Isfahan, is famous for its mosque. Its current structure is rebuilt in the contemporary era, but some of the plaster works and paintings are from the Safavid age. Some of the inscriptions on the portal are the art works of Mohammad Reza Emami. Besides there is an extraordinary wooden minbar which is one of the most exquisite artworks from the time of the Safavid dynasty.

Aboutorab Esfahani, the important calligrapher of the Safavid era, has been buried in this mosque.

References 

Mosques in Isfahan